The 2013 East Carolina Pirates football team represented East Carolina University in the 2013 NCAA Division I FBS football season. They were led by fourth-year head coach Ruffin McNeill and played their home games at Dowdy–Ficklen Stadium. They were a member of the East Division of Conference USA. This was their final season in C-USA before joining the American Athletic Conference in 2014.

Schedule

Schedule Source:

Game summaries

Old Dominion

Florida Atlantic

Virginia Tech

at North Carolina

at Middle Tennessee

at Tulane

Southern Miss

at FIU

Tulsa

UAB

at NC State

at Marshall

This was the fifteenth time these two teams have faced each other. East Carolina leads the overall win–loss record 10–5.

Ohio–Beef 'O' Brady's Bowl

References

East Carolina
East Carolina Pirates football seasons
Gasparilla Bowl champion seasons
East Carolina Pirates football